Letto is a Pop Rock band formed in Yogyakarta, Indonesia in 2004. The group comprises vocalist Noe, drummer Dhedot, bassist Arian and guitarist Patub.

Letto are known for their hit singles, such as "Sandaran Hati", "Ruang Rindu", "Sebelum Cahaya" and "Lubang di Hati". The first album titled Truth, Cry and Lie, released in 2005.

Discography

External links 
 Official site

Musical groups established in 2004
Indonesian pop music groups
2004 establishments in Indonesia